The Church of Christ in the Sudan Among the Tiv (Nongo u Kristu u ken Sudan hen tiv, NKST) is a confessional Christian Reformed denomination in Nigeria.

Origin 
The church was founded by the Dutch Reformed Church in South Africa. This mission work was among ethnic Tiv people. Later this work was overtaken by the Christian Reformed Church in North America. In 1957 the church become self-supporting and autonomous, self-propagating denomination. The center of the denomination is in Mkar in Benue Province.In Mkar there's a Theological Seminary to train pastors. The denomination has 200 congregations and 2,000 mission stations and 400,000 members. The theological training of ministers provided in Mkar Theological Seminary in Nigeria.

The denomination's Theology is Reformed, it adheres to the Three Forms of Unity. In the Synod in 2012 the church become the Universal Reformed Christian Church.
The Church has about 500 primary schools 50 secondary schools and a university.
The denomination has a new name, it is called the Universal Reformed Christian Church it was adopted in the Synod meeting in the Northern Nigeria Theological College.

Theology 
It recognises the Heidelberg Catechism and the Westminster Confession of Faith.

Interfaith relations 
It is  a member of the World Alliance of Reformed Churches and the Reformed Ecumenical Council. It cooperates with the Christian Reformed Church in North America, which has its seat in Grand Rapids, Michigan. The Tiv are an ethnic group, which speaks the Tiv language, which is a Niger-Congo-language. The denomination has sister church relations with the Reformed Churches in the Netherlands (Liberated).

See also 
Christianity in Nigeria

References 

Christian denominations in Nigeria
Members of the World Communion of Reformed Churches
Reformed denominations in Africa
1957 establishments in Nigeria